The Arkansas Department of Energy and Environment is a cabinet level agency in the executive branch of Arkansas government responsible for implementation of the rules and regulations regarding the management of natural resources and protecting the environment of the state.

Boards and Commissions
In Arkansas's shared services model of state government, the cabinet-level agencies assist boards and commissions who have an overlapping scope. ADEE supports:

Boards
Liquified Petroleum Gas Board
Marketing Board for Recyclables
Commissions
 Arkansas Geological Commission
Arkansas Pollution Control and Ecology Commission
Oil and Gas Commission
Solid Waste Licensing Committee
Wastewater Licensing Committee
Committees
Petroleum Storage Tanks Advisory Committee
Panels
 Nutrient Water Quality Trading Advisory Panel
 Compliance Advisory Panel

Of these entities, three have regulatory powers: the Arkansas Pollution Control and Ecology Commission, Liquified Petroleum Gas Board, and Oil and Gas Commission. Various divisions and offices are tasked with enforcing the regulations drafted by these bodies. The remainder are advisory and make recommendations to the legislature or governor.

Divisions

Energy

Environmental Quality
The Division of Environmental Quality (ADEQ or commonly DEQ within the state) is responsible for protecting human health and for safeguarding the natural environment: air, water, and land. DEQ is responsible for permitting and ensuring compliance with the regulations of the Arkansas Pollution Control and Ecology Commission, which makes environmental policy in Arkansas.

It is governed by the thirteen member Arkansas Pollution Control and Ecology Commission, with six members representing various state agencies and seven appointed by the Governor.

Regulatory Offices
Air Quality
Energy
Land Resources
Surface Mining & Reclamation Program
Water

Support Offices
Secretary's Office
Public Outreach & Assistance

See also
 List of Arkansas state agencies

References

External links
 Department of Environmental Quality homepage
 US Environmental Protection Agency homepage

Environment of Arkansas
Environmental Quality, Department of
Arkansas
1949 establishments in Arkansas
Energy in Arkansas